The Magaliesberg Protected Natural Environment is one of two core zones found within the Magaliesberg Biosphere Reserve along the Magaliesberg mountain range in South Africa. West of the protected area is a Ramsar site where the Kgaswane Mountain Reserve is situated. The Hartbeespoort Dam Nature Reserve crosses it on the eastern side.

History 
The process to protect the area began in the 1960s. In 1977, it was declared a Natural Area. The entirety of the Magaliesberg Protected Natural Environment, excluding Kgaswane Mountain Reserve, is privately owned.

See also 

 List of protected areas of South Africa

References 

Protected areas of South Africa